Alan Lewis (born 20 November 1950 in Glengormley) is an Irish sport shooter. He tied for 41st place in the men's 50 metre rifle prone event at the 2000 Summer Olympics.

References

External links
 

1950 births
Living people
ISSF rifle shooters
Male sport shooters from Northern Ireland
Olympic shooters of Ireland
Shooters at the 2000 Summer Olympics
Sportspeople from County Antrim